The Civil Aviation Safety Board or the Civil Aviation Safety Bureau (CASB, POLÉBISZ or PoLéBiSz) was an agency of the government of Hungary. It served as the country's aviation accident investigation agency for four years, when it investigated over five hundred aircraft accidents and incidents. It had its headquarters at Building 13, Budapest Ferihegy International Airport Terminal 1 in Budapest.

The Minister for Economy and Transport created the agency that succeeded the CASB, the Transportation Safety Bureau, on 1 February 2006.

See also

 Civil Aviation Authority (Hungary)

References

External links
 Archive of CASB website - Transportation Safety Bureau
 Archive of CASB website - Transportation Safety Bureau 
 Civil Aviation Safety Bureau of Hungary 

Government agencies of Hungary
Organizations investigating aviation accidents and incidents
2006 disestablishments in Hungary
Aviation organisations based in Hungary
Civil aviation in Hungary